Kiranagi  is a village in the southern state of Karnataka, India. It is located in the Gulbarga taluk of Kalaburagi district in Karnataka.

It is said that during the Indo-China war in 1962, the then Karnataka chief minister Veerendra Patil (1924-1997) visited Kirangi village in Gulbarga district in a Statewide campaign for raising funds for the government. Hearing about the cause, the villagers of Kirangi reacted with a surge of patriotism and mobilised more than 100 tolas of gold within an hour and handed over the donation to Patil. The chief minister was astounded by the prosperity of the village and the large-heartedness of the community. He immediately gave Kirangi a new name: Honna Kirangi (Honnu meaning gold).

Large tracts of land surrounding Honna Kirangi; acres and acres of rich, black soil seemed to touch the horizon. The beauty of Honna Kirangi lies in its colourful but sturdy buildings and hospitable people. At first glance, the visitor is struck by the varied colours on the walls of many residential buildings. Use of Shahabad stone slabs for both flooring and roofing adds its own charm. Thanks to the ideal weight, texture and colour, the stone lends grace and solidity to these rural homes. Even the streets are cobbled and in some places, Honna Kirangi could probably match the looks of a tiny European rural hamlet!. There are many striking features of Honna Kirangi's homes but the one which stands out is the ornate entrance doors and the pair of horses which adorn their sides. In the good old days, many homes had real, graceful horses which were not only status symbols but also means of transport.

Demographics
 India census, Kiranagi had a population of 5658 with 2903 males and 2755 females.

See also
 Gulbarga
 Districts of Karnataka

References

External links
 http://Gulbarga.nic.in/

Villages in Kalaburagi district